Remya may refer to:

 Remya Nambeeshan (born 1986), Indian actress.
 Remya, a genus of plants in the family Asteraceae.

See also 
 Ramya (disambiguation)